Alexandre Choron may refer to:
 Alexandre Étienne Choron, French chef
 Alexandre-Étienne Choron, French musician